Dussia is a genus of flowering plants in the family Fabaceae. 

The genus name of Dussia is in honour of Antoine Duss (1840–1924), who was a Swiss botanist.

It contains the following species:

 Dussia coriacea Pierce
 Dussia cuscatlanica (Standl.) Standl. & Steyerm.
 Dussia discolor (Benth.) Amshoff
 Dussia foxii Rudd

 Dussia lehmannii Harms
 Dussia macroprophyllata (Donn. Sm.) Harms
 Dussia martinicensis Taub.
 Dussia mexicana (Standl.) Harms

 Dussia sanguinea Urb. & Ekman
 Dussia tessmannii Harms

References

Amburaneae
Fabaceae genera
Taxonomy articles created by Polbot